Gedeo is the name of
 Gedeo people, an ethnic group in Ethiopia
 Gedeo language, the language spoken by the Gedeo
 Gedeo Zone, an administrative zone of Ethiopia.

Language and nationality disambiguation pages